Piazza Vittorio Veneto, also known as Piazza Vittorio, is a city square in Turin, Italy, which takes its name from the Battle of Vittorio Veneto in 1918.

During the construction of an underground carpark in 2004, workers uncovered 22 skeletons dating from the early 18th century; a study published in 2019 indicates these are almost certainly casualties from the 1706 Siege of Turin.

Buildings around the square
Ponte Vittorio Emanuele I
Gran Madre di Dio, Turin
Borgo Po

Sources

 

Piazzas in Turin